The Ministry of Education (Spanish: Ministerio de Educación or MINERD) of the Dominican Republic is a government institution in charge of planning, managing and making the country's education system, as well as administrating public schools and supervising private centers. By law, this Ministry receives 4% of the Dominican gross domestic product.

It appeared as its own entity on 1934 as the Secretary of State of Education and Fine Arts (Secretaría de Estado de Educación y Bellas Artes), although it wouldn't be until 2000 when it focused exclusively on education. Its headquarters are located at Santo Domingo. Its Minister is Ángel Hernández Castillo, since August 8, 2022.

History 
Since 1844, Dominican education was in charge of the Secretary of State of Justice and Public Instruction (Spanish: Secretaría de Estado de Justicia e Instrucción Pública), which is nowadays the Office of the Attorney General of the Republic. On 1931, this institution was suppressed; its functions in the matter of justice were transferred to the Office of the Attorney General by Law no. 79, and its roles on education and Fine Arts were transferred to the General Superintendency of Education (Superintendencia General de Enseñanza).

Years later, on November 30, 1934, by Law no. 786, the Secretary of State of Education and Fine Arts (Secretaría de Estado de Educación y Bellas Artes) was created, thus replacing the term "public instruction" for education. On 1965, it will become the Secretary of State of Education, Fine Arts and Worship (Secretaría de Estado de Educación, Bellas Artes y Cultos) by receiving functions of the Secretary of State of External Relations. Later on, the office would be renamed as Secretary of State of Education and Culture (Secretaría de Estado de Educación y Cultura) by Law no. 66–97, which redefined the education system of the Dominican Republic.

It would adopt its current attributions on 2000 with the creation of the Secretary of State of Culture, by Law no. 41–00, thus becoming the Secretary of State of Education (Secretaría de Estado de Educación).

It adopted its current name, Ministry of Education (Ministerio de Educación), after the 2010 Constitutional reform and the subsequent Decree no. 56-10 which changed the names of all government agencies.

Internal structure 
Similar to other Ministries of the Dominican Republic, the Ministry of Education is subdivided into vice-ministries. These are:

 Vice-ministry of Teaching Accreditation and Certification
 Vice-ministry of Supervision, Evaluation and Control of Education Quality

Inside the Ministry, other offices are:

 General Office of Early Education
 General Office of Primary Education
 General Office of Middle and High School Education
 General Office of Education for Young Adults and Adults
 General Office of Special Education
 General Office of Counseling and Psychology
 General Office of Culture
 General Office of Evaluation
 General Office of Syllabus

Other departments and agencies are:

 National Office for Education Planning and Development
 International Cooperation Office
 Ministry of Education's United Nations Model
 Office for the Free Access to Information
 Purchase and Contracting Department
 Educational Radio-Television

Affiliated institutions 
The Ministry of Education has several institutions affiliated to it, dedicated to the well-being of students and teachers. These are:

 National Institute of Comprehensive Attention for Early Infancy (INAIPI)
 Dominican Institute of Evaluation and Investigation of Education Quality (IDEICE)
 Salomé Ureña Higher Institute of Teacher Training (ISFODOSU), named after Dominican educator and poet Salomé Ureña
 National Institute for Teacher Training (INAFOCAM)
 National Institute for Teachers' Well-being (INABIMA)
 National Institute for Students' Well-being (INABIE)
 Dominican Teachers' Health Risks Administration (ARS SEMMA)
 National Institute for Physical Education (INEFI)

Statistics and publications 
The Ministry of Education has a comprehensive list of data and statistics on its website. There you can find a map of all education centers in the country.

According to this website, the number of students by academic year was as follows:

References

External links 

 Ministry of Education - official website

Government of the Dominican Republic
Education in the Dominican Republic
Dominican_Republic